Gunter or  Günter may refer to:

 Gunter rig, a type of rig used in sailing, especially in small boats
 Gunter Annex, Alabama, a United States Air Force installation
 Gunter, Texas, city in the United States

People

Surname 
 Chris Gunter (born 1989), Welsh footballer with Cardiff City, Tottenham Hotspur, Nottingham Forest and Reading
 Cornell Gunter (1936–1990), American R&B singer, brother of Shirley Gunter
 David Gunter (1933–2005), English footballer with Southampton, brother of Phil Gunter
 Edmund Gunter (1581–1626), British mathematician and inventor, known for:
 Gunter's chain
 Gunter's rule
 James Gunter (1745–1819), English confectioner, fruit grower and scientific gardener
 Jen Gunter (born 1966), Canadian-American gynecologist & author
 Gordon Gunter (1909–1998), American marine biologist and fisheries scientist
 Matthew Alan Gunter (born 1957), United States Episcopal bishop
 Phil Gunter (1932–2007), English footballer with Portsmouth and Aldershot, brother of David (1933–2005)
 Ray Gunter (1909–1977), British Labour Party politician
 Sir Robert Gunter (1831–1905), British army officer, property developer and politician
 Shirley Gunter (1934–2015), American R&B singer, sister of Cornell Gunter
 Sibylle Günter (born 1964), German theoretical physicist

First name 
 Günter Abel (born 1947), German philosopher and former professor
 Günter Altner (1936–2011), German interdisciplanarily active scientist, biologist, Protestant theologian, ecologist, environmentalist, writer, and lecturer
 Günter Ambraß (born 1955), East German weightlifter
 Günter Anderl (1947–2015), Austrian figure skater
 Günter Asser (1926–2015), German professor emeritus of logic and mathematics
 Günter Bartusch (1943–1971), East German motorcycle road racer
 Günter Baum (born 1960), German politician and LGBT rights activist
 Günter Baumann (born 1947), German politician
 Günter Behnisch (1922–2010), German architect
 Günter Beier (born 1942), German gymnast
 Günter Benkö (born 1955), Austrian football (soccer) referee
 Günter Benser (born 1931), German Marxist historian
 Günter Bentele (born 1948), German semiotician
 Günter Bergau (born 1939), German rower
 Günter Bernard (born 1939), German professional footballer
 Günter Bialas (1907–1995), German composer
 Günter Bischof (born 1953), Austrian-American historian and professor
 Günter Bittengel (born 1966), Czech football (soccer) coach and former player
 Günter Böckle (born 1949), German software engineer and project manager
 Günter Böhme (politician, born 1925) (1925–2006), German politician
 Günter Böttcher (1954–2012), West German handball player
 Günter Breithardt (born 1944), German physician, cardiologist, and emeritus professor
 Günter Breitzke (born 1967), German footballer
 Günter Bresnik (born 1961), Austrian tennis coach
 Gunter Brewer (born 1964), American football coach
 Günter Brocker (1925–2015), German footballer and later manager
 Günter Brümmer (1933–2020), West German slalom canoeist
 Günter Brus (born 1938), Austrian painter, performance artist, graphic artist, experimental filmmaker, and writer
 Günter Busarello (1960–1985), Austrian wrestler
 Günter Busch (1930–2006), German footballer
 Günter Burg (born 1941), German dermatologist
 Günter Burghard (born 1942), Austrian ice hockey player
 Günter Burghardt, European civil servant to the United States
 Günter Bust (1930–2005), German music educator and composer
 Gunter Christmann (1936–2013), German-born Australian painter
 Gunter d'Alquen (1910–1998), German journalist, propagandist, and author
 Günter de Bruyn (1926–2020), German author
 Günter Deckert (1940–2022), German far-right political activist
 Günter Deckert (nordic combined) (1950–2005), East German nordic combined skier
 Gunter Demnig (born 1947), German artist
 Günter Deuble, West German slalom canoeist
 Günter Dohrow (1927–2008), German middle-distance runner
 Günter Dreibrodt (born 1951), East German handball player
 Günter Drews (born 1967), German footballer
 Günter Dreyer (1943–2019), German Egyptologist
 Günter Dyhrenfurth (1886–1975), German-born, German and Swiss mountaineer, geologist, and Himalayan explorer
 Günter Eich (1907–1972), German lyricist, dramatist, and author
 Günter Faltin (born 1944), German economist and entrepreneur
 Gunter Faure, American geochemist
 Günter Felke (1929–2005), German furniture manufacturer, numismatist, and patron of culture
 Günter Flauger (born 1936), German skier
 Günter Friesenbichler (born 1979), Austrian footballer
 Günter Fronius (1907–2015), Austrian entrepreneur
 Günter Fronzeck (born 1937), German footballer
 Günter Fruhtrunk (1923–1982), German geometric abstract painter and printmaker
 Gunter Gabriel (1942–2017), German singer, musician, and composer
 Günter Gaus (1929–2004), German political journalist, commentator, television interviewer, diplomat, and “government fixer”
 Günter Gerhard Lange (1921–2008), German typographer, teacher, and type designer
 Günter Glende (1918–2004), East German party official
 Günter Grasmück, member of Opus (Austrian band)
 Günter Grass (1927–2015), German novelist, poet, playwright, illustrator, graphic artist, sculptor, and literature prize recipient
 Günter Graulich (born 1926), German church musician and music publisher
 Günter Grönbold (born 1943), German Indologist and Tibetologist
 Günter Grosswig, East German slalom canoeist
 Günter Guillaume (1927–1995), German spy
 Günter Güttler (born 1961), German footballer and manager
 Günter Habig (born 1964), German footballer
 Gunter Hadwiger (1949–2021), Austrian politician
 Günter Halm (1922–2017), German infantryman
 Gunter Hampel (born 1937), German jazz vibraphonist, clarinetist, saxophonist, flautist, pianist, and composer
 Günter Harder (born 1938), German mathematician
 Günter Haritz (born 1948), West German road and track cyclist
 Günter Haumer (born 1973), Austrian operatic baritone
 Günter Havenstein (1928–2008), German long-distance runner
 Günter Heimbeck (born 1946), German-Namibian professor of mathematics
 Günter Heine (born 1919), German water polo player
 Günter-Helge Strickstrack (1921–2020), German politician
 Günter Henle (1899–1979), German politician, pianist, music publisher
 Günter Herburger (1932–2018), German writer
 Günter Herlitz (1913–2010), German businessman
 Günter Hermann (born 1960), German footballer
 Günter Hermann Ewen (1962–1999), German mass murderer
 Günter Herz (born 1940), German businessman
 Günter Heßelmann (1925–2010), German middle-distance runner
 Günter Hessler (1909–1968), German naval officer
 Günter Heyden (1921–2002), German professor of philosophy and a sociologist
 Günter Hirsch (born 1943), German legal scholar
 Günter Hirschmann (born 1935), German footballer
 Günter Hoffmann (disambiguation), several people
 Günter Hoge (1940–2017), German footballer
 Günter Holzvoigt, East German sprint canoeist
 Günter Hotz (born 1931), German pioneer of computer science
 Günter Jäger (born 1935), German footballer
 Gunter Jahn (1910–1992), German U-boat commander
 Günter Jena (born 1933), German choral conductor and musicologist
 Günter Jochems (1928–1991), German professional ice hockey player
 Günter Kaltenbrunner (born 1943), Austrian former footballer and manager
 Günter Kaslowski (1934–2001), German cyclist
 Günter Katzenberger (1937–2020), German musician, musicologist, conductor, professor, writer, and publisher
 Günter Kehr (1920–1989), German violinist, conductor, and academic teacher of violin and chamber music
 Günter Keute (born 1955), German footballer
 Günter Kießling (1925–2009), German general
 Günter Kilian (born 1950), German water polo player
 Günter Kirchner, West German slalom canoeist
 Günter Klass (1936–1967), German racing driver
 Günter Kleinen (born 1941), German musicologist and professor of musicology
 Günter Kochan (1930–2009), German composer
 Günter Konzack (1930–2008), East German footballer
 Günter Koren (born 1962), Austrian ice hockey player
 Günter Kowalewski (born 1943), German wrestler
 Günter Krämer (born 1940), German stage director and theatre manager
 Günter Krammer, West German sprint canoeist
 Günter Krings (born 1969), German lawyer and politician
 Günter Krispel (born 1951), Austrian bobsledder
 Günter Krivec (born 1942), German athlete
 Günter Kronsteiner (born 1953), Austrian footballer
 Günter Krüger (disambiguation), several people
 Günter Kubisch (1939–2005), East German footballer
 Günter Kuhnke (1912–1990), German submarine commander
 Günter Kunert (1929–2019), German writer
 Günter Kutowski (born 1965), German professional footballer
 Günter Lach (1954–2021), German politician
 Günter Lamprecht (1930–2022), German actor
 Günter Lenz (born 1938), German jazz bassist and composer
 Günter Litfin (1937–1961), German tailor
 Günter Lobing, German lightweight rower
 Günter Lorenz (born 1964/1965), Austrian murderer
 Günter Lörke (born 1935), German cyclist
 Günter Ludwig (born 1931), German pianist
 Günter Lüling (1928–2014), German Protestant theologian, philological scholar, and pioneer in the study of early Islam
 Günter Lumer (1929–2005), German mathematician
 Günter Luther (1922–1997), German admiral
 Günter Lyhs (born 1934), German gymnast
 Günter M. Ziegler (born 1963), German mathematician
 Günter Mack (1930–2007), German actor
 Günter Malcher (born 1934), German athlete
 Gunter Malle (born 1960), German mathematician
 Günter Maschke (1943–2022), German political scientist
 Günter Mast (1927–2011), German businessman
 Günter Mayer (1930–2010), German cultural academic and musicologist
 Günter Meißner (1936–2015), German art historian
 Günter Meisner (1926–1994), German film and television character actor
 Günter Meyer (born 1946), German Geographer and Orientalist
 Günter Mielke (1942–2010), West German long-distance runner
 Günter Mittag (1926–1994), German politician
 Günter Morge (1925–1984), German entomologist
 Günter Müller (born 1954), German-born Swiss sound artist
 Günter Nachtigall (born 1930), German gymnast
 Günter Netzer (born 1944), German footballer
 Günter Neuburger (born 1954), West German bobsledder
 Günter Neubert (born 1936), German composer and tonmeister
 Günter Neuhold (born 1947), Austrian conductor
 Günter Neumann (disambiguation), several people
 Günter Nimtz (born 1936), German physicist
 Günter Nooke (born 1959), German CDU politician and former civil rights activist
 Günter Nowatzki, German sprint canoeist
 Günter Oberhuber (born 1954), Austrian ice hockey player
 Günter Ollenschläger (born 1951), German physician, medical editor, and professor of internal medicine and clinical decision making
 Günter Orschel (born 1956), Bulgarian equestrian
 Günter P. Wagner (born 1954), Austrian-born evolutionary biologist
 Gunter Pauli (born 1956), Belgian entrepreneur, economist, and author
 Günter Petersmann (born 1941), German rower
 Günter Pfitzmann (1924–2003), German film actor
 Günter Pichler (born 1940), Austrian violinist, teacher, and conductor
 Günter Pilz (born 1945), Austrian mathematician and professor
 Günter Platzek (1930–1990), German keyboard player
 Gunter Pleuger (born 1941), German diplomat and politician
 Günter Preuß (born 1936), German footballer
 Günter Pröpper (born 1941), German professional footballer
 Gunter Prus (died 1232), Polish Roman Catholic bishop
 Günter Raphael (1903–1960), German composer
 Günter Reich (1921–1989), German-born Israeli baritone 
 Günter Reimann (1904–2005), German-born economist and writer
 Günter Reisch (1927–2014), German film director and screenwriter
 Günter Rexrodt (1941–2004), German politician
 Günter Riesen (1892–1951), German Nazi politician
 Günter Rimkus (1928–2015), German dramaturge
 Günter Rittner (1927–2020), German painter and illustrator
 Gunter Rodríguez (born 1981), Cuban swimmer
 Günter Ropohl (1939–2017), German technology philosopher
 Günter Rössler (1926–2012), German photographer
 Günter Ruch (1956–2010), German writer, journalist, politician, and author
 Gunter Sachs (1932–2011), German photographer, author, student, industrialist, and astrologist
 Günter Sauerbrey (1933–2003), German physicist, inventor of the quartz crystal microbalance
 Günter Sawitzki (1932–2020), German footballer
 Günter Schabowski (1929–2015), East German politician
 Günter Schaumburg (born 1943), German athlete
 Günter Schießwald (born 1973), Austrian footballer
 Günter Schilder (born 1942), Dutch historian
 Günter Schlierkamp (born 1970), German IFBB professional bodybuilder
 Günter Schlipper (born 1962), German footballer
 Günter Schliwka (born 1956), German weightlifter
 Günter Schmahl (1936–2018), German physicist, professor, and pioneer
 Günter Schmid (1932–2005), German motorsport founder and principal
 Gunter Schmidt (born 1938), German sexologist, psychotherapist, and social psychologist
 Günter Schmidt (arachnologist) (1926–2016), German arachnologist and author
 Günter Schmölders (1903–1991), German economist
 Günter Schneider (born 1963), Swiss rower
 Gunter Schöbel (born 1959), German archaeologist and museum director
 Gunter Schoß (born 1940), German voice and television actor
 Günter Schroers (born 1939), German rower
 Günter Schröter (1927–2016), German footballer and coach
 Günter Schubert (1938–2008), German actor and voice actor
 Günter Schulz (born 1963), German musician, songwriter, and former member of the industrial band KMFDM
 Günter Schwartzkopff (1898–1940), German military officer
 Günter Sebert (born 1948), German former footballer and manager
 Gunter Segers, Belgian children’s book author, non-fiction book author, graphic designer, and illustrator
 Günter Seibold (1936–2013), German footballer
 Gunter Sieberth (born 1965), German oboist
 Günter Siegmund (1936–2020), East German heavyweight boxer
 Gunter Silva Passuni (born 1977), Peruvian writer
 Günter Simon (born 1933), German journalist
 Günter Sommer (born 1943), German jazz drummer
 Günter Spies (born 1948), German gymnast
 Günter Spindler (born 1949), German wrestler
 Günter Steinhausen (1917–1942), German aviator
 Günter Steinke (born 1956), German composer and teacher
 Günter Stempel (1908–1981), German politician and lawyer
 Günter Stephan (disambiguation), several people
 Günter Strack (1929–1999), German film and television actor
 Günter Stratmann (born 1931), German fencer
 Günter Tembrock (1918–2011), East German zoologist
 Günter Theißen (born 1962), German geneticist
 Gunter Thiebaut (born 1977), Belgian footballer
 Gunter Thielen (born 1942), German chief executive
 Günter Thorhauer (1931–2007), East German footballer
 Günter Tilch (born 1937), German speed skater
 Günter Tittes (born 1936), East German breaststroke swimmer
 Günter Traub (born 1939), German speed skater
 Gunter Trojovsky, West German slalom canoeist
 Günter Twiesselmann (born 1925), German rower
 Gunter Vanderveeren (born 1970), Belgian tennis player
 Gunter Van Handenhoven (born 1978), Belgian footballer and team manager
 Günter Verheugen (born 1944), German politician
 Gunter Verjans (born 1973), Belgian footballer
 Günter Vetter (1936–2022), Austrian stonemason and politician
 Günter Voglmayr (1968–2012), Austrian classical flutist
 Günter Voigt (born 1933), German military scientist and major general
 Günter Vollmer (1917–2004), Nazi Germany officer
 Günter von Drenkmann (1910–1974), German lawyer
 Günter Wächtershäuser (born 1938), German chemist turned patent lawyer
 Gunter Waldek (born 1953), Austrian composer, conductor, and music educator
 Günter Wallraff (born 1942), German writer and undercover journalist
 Günter Wand (1912–2002), German orchestra conductor and composer
 Günter Weigand (born 1924), German economist, self-proclaimed social lawyer, and amateur prosecutor
 Günter Weiler (born 1951), German army officer and lieutenant general
 Günter Weitling (born 1935), Danish Lutheran theologian, historian, and author
 Günter Wewel (born 1934), German operatic bass and television presenter
 Günter Wienhold (1948–2021), German footballer
 Günter Wirths (1911–2005), German chemist
 Günter Wolf (born 1949), German water polo player
 Günter Wyszecki (1925–1985), German-Canadian physicist
 Günter Zeitler, German handballer
 Günter Zöller (born 1948), German figure skating coach and former East German competitor

Fictional characters 

 Gunter, a recurring penguin character on the animated series Adventure Time
 Gunter, in the video game Fire Emblem Fates

See also
Günther (disambiguation)
Guntur (disambiguation)